is the Japanese word for era and can refer to:
 Jidai (Arashi song)
 Jidai (Miyuki Nakajima song)
 Jidaimono, a Japanese dramatic genre;
 Jidaigeki, a Japanese dramatic genre.